Prasat Sambour is a district within Kampong Thom Province, in central  Cambodia. According to the 1998 census of Cambodia, it had a population of 36,983.

It is known for its ancient monuments and temples.

Administration 
The following table shows the villages of Prasat Sambour District by commune.

References 

Districts of Kampong Thom province